Lorenzo Rimkus (born 22 September 1984) is a Dutch former professional footballer who played as a midfielder.

Career
Rimkus made his debut in professional football on 5 April 2002 for Sparta Rotterdam in a game against FC Twente replacing Dave van der Meer in the 69th minute.

He formerly played for SV ARC.

Personal life
Rimkus is of Surinamese descent, from his mother side.

References

External links
 
 
 dutchplayers.nl profile
 Voetbal International profile

1984 births
Living people
Dutch sportspeople of Surinamese descent
Dutch footballers
Footballers from Rotterdam
Association football midfielders
Eredivisie players
Eerste Divisie players
Challenger Pro League players
Sparta Rotterdam players
FC Den Bosch players
Lierse S.K. players
KFC Turnhout players
PSIM Yogyakarta players
Dutch expatriate footballers
Dutch expatriate sportspeople in Belgium
Expatriate footballers in Belgium
Dutch expatriate sportspeople in Indonesia
Expatriate footballers in Indonesia
SV ARC players